Doña Juana is a 1927 German silent comedy drama film directed by Paul Czinner and starring Elisabeth Bergner, Walter Rilla, and Hertha von Walther. It was based on a Spanish play by Tirso de Molina. The adaptation was done by Béla Balázs, who later tried to have his name removed from the credits because he disliked the finished version of the film. The film was shot on location around Seville and Granada in southern Spain.

Plot
The story is based on a traditional seventeenth century play about a nobleman who educates his daughter to be raised as a boy, leading to a series of confusions in her romantic life.

Cast

References

Bibliography
 
 Congdon, Lee. Exile and Social Thought: Hungarian Intellectuals in Germany and Austria, 1919-1933. Princeton University Press, 2014.
 Kracauer, Siegfried. From Caligari to Hitler: A Psychological History of the German Film. Princeton University Press, 2019.
 Schmitt, Gavin. Karl Freund: The Life and Films. McFarland, 2022.

External links

1927 films
1920s historical comedy-drama films
German historical comedy-drama films
German silent feature films
Films of the Weimar Republic
Films directed by Paul Czinner
German films based on plays
Films with screenplays by Paul Czinner
Films set in Spain
Films set in the 17th century
Films shot in Spain
UFA GmbH films
German black-and-white films
1927 comedy-drama films
1920s German films
1920s German-language films